The 1955 Houston Cougars football team was an American football team that represented the University of Houston in the Missouri Valley Conference (MVC) during the 1955 college football season. In its first season under head coach Bill Meek, the team compiled a 6–4 record (2–2 against conference opponents) and finished in third place out of five teams in the MVC. Jim Blackstone and Lavell Isbell were the team captains. The team played its home games at Rice Stadium in Houston.

Schedule

References

Houston
Houston Cougars football seasons
Houston Cougars football